The men's 1500 metre freestyle event at the 2002 Commonwealth Games as part of the swimming programme took place on 3 and 4 August at the Manchester Aquatics Centre in Manchester, England.

Records
Prior to this competition, the existing world and Commonwealth Games records were as follows.

Results

Heats

Final

References

External links

Men's 1500 metre freestyle
Commonwealth Games